The 1st New Hampshire Regiment was an infantry unit that came into existence on 22 May 1775 at the beginning of the American Revolutionary War. John Stark was the regiment's first commander. The unit fought at Chelsea Creek and Bunker Hill in 1775. On 1 January 1776, while engaged in the Siege of Boston, the unit was renamed the 5th Continental Regiment. In the spring it was sent to Canada where the New Hampshire soldiers fought at Trois-Rivières and later helped defend the area around Lake Champlain. Late in the year, the 5th Continental Regiment was transferred south to George Washington's main army where it fought at Trenton.

On 1 January 1777 the unit was renamed the 1st New Hampshire Regiment and it saw action at Princeton before being sent back to the Northern Department. The regiment fought at Saratoga in the fall of 1777. That winter it was transferred to Washington's army and fought at Monmouth in the summer of 1778. The troops participated in Sullivan's Expedition in the summer of 1779. The unit stayed with the main army until August 1781 when it was left to defend the Hudson Highlands. The regiment rejoined the main army in late 1782 and was renamed the New Hampshire Regiment in early 1783. After first being reduced to a battalion, the unit was disbanded on 1 January 1784.

History
The 1st New Hampshire Regiment was authorized as New Hampshire State Troops on 22 May 1775, and was organized as 10 companies of 800 volunteers from Hillsborough and Rockingham counties of the colony of New Hampshire at Medford, Massachusetts, commanded by John Stark. The regiment was adopted into the Continental Army on 14 June 1775, and assigned to General John Sullivan's brigade on 22 July 1775.  The regiment saw action at the Battle of Bunker Hill.

The regiment was redesignated the 5th Continental Regiment on 1 January 1776, as eight companies in Sullivan's Brigade in the main Continental Army. On 27 April 1776, the regiment was relieved from the brigade and assigned to the Canadian Department. On 2 July 1776, the regiment was reassigned to the Northern Department, and on 20 July 1776, it was assigned to General John Stark's brigade. On 26 November 1776, the regiment was reassigned to the main Continental Army and later assigned to Sullivan's brigade.

On 1 January 1777, the 5th Continental Regiment was re-organized to eight companies and redesignated as the 1st New Hampshire Regiment. The regiment was relieved from the brigade on 14 February 1777, and assigned to the Northern Department. On 28 April 1777, the regiment was assigned to the New Hampshire Brigade. On 20 October 1777, the brigade was reassigned to the main army and re-organized to nine companies on 23 December 1778. The brigade was reassigned to the Highlands Department on 19 August 1781. Between 10 and 14 October 1781, the brigade was reassigned to the Northern Department. On 12 November 1782, the brigade was reassigned to the main army. The regiment was redesignated as the New Hampshire Regiment and re-organized as nine companies on 1 March 1783.

Service record

Notable members
John Stark
Joseph Cilley
Henry Dearborn
Caleb Stark
John Simpson
Captain Samuel Richards
Isaac Wyman
Captain Nathaniel Hutchins

See also
1st New Hampshire Volunteer Regiment (American Civil War)

Notes

References
 
 "Death Seem'd to Stare": The New Hampshire And Rhode Island Regiments at Valley Forge by Joseph Lee Boyle, Clearfield Co, 1995 
Officer and staff of 1st NH Regt.
State Builders: An Illustrated Historical and Biographical Record of the State of New Hampshire. State Builers Publishing Manchester, NH 1903

External links
 History of the 1st New Hampshire Regiment
Roster of 1st New Hampshire Officers
First New Hampshire Regiment reenactment group
Bibliography of the Continental Army in New Hampshire compiled by the United States Army Center of Military History

Military units and formations established in 1775
New Hampshire regiments of the Continental Army